

Events 
The father of Gioachino Rossini is imprisoned for collaborating with the French, and Rossini's mother takes him to Bologna.

Classical Music 
Ludwig van Beethoven 
Three Piano Sonatas, Op. 2 in F minor, A and C
Notturno in D major, Op.42
Ah! Perfido, Op.65
Duet mit zwei obligaten Augengläsern, WoO 32
Sonatina for Mandolin and Harpsichord, WoO 43a
Adagio for Mandolin and Harpsichord, WoO 43b
Allegretto, WoO 53
Abschiedsgesang an Wiens Bürger, WoO 121
Francois-Adrien Boieldieu – Duo No.2 in B-flat major for Harp and Piano
Muzio Clementi
Concerto for piano in C major
Three Piano Sonatas, Op. 35
Johann Baptist Cramer – Piano Concerto No.2, Op. 16
Adalbert Gyrowetz – 3 String Quartets, Op. 13
Joseph Haydn 
Trumpet Concerto in E Flat Major
Die Worte des Erlösers am Kreuze, Hob.XX:2
Mass in C major, Hob.XXII:9 Missa in tempore belli ("Mass in Time of War")
Mass in B-flat major, Hob.XXII:10
Guarda qui, che lo vedrai, Hob.XXVa:1
Saper vorrei se m'ami, Hob.XXVa:2
Hyacinthe Jadin – 3 Piano Sonatas, Op. 5
Rodolphe Kreutzer – Études ou caprices
Ignaz Pleyel – 6 Duos, B.574-579
Giovanni Punto – Horn Concerto No.6
Jakub Jan Ryba – Missa pastoralis bohemica
Carl Friedrich Zelter – 12 Lieder am Clavier zu singen, Z.120

Opera
Domenico Cimarosa 
I nemici generosi
Gli Orazi e i Curiazi
Nicolas Dalayrac – Marianne
Johann Simon Mayr – La Lodoiska
Antonio Salieri – Il Moro
Gaspare Spontini – Li puntigli delle donne
Peter Winter – Das unterbrochene Opferfest

Popular music
 "It Was A' For Our Rightful King", 1796 Jacobite song with lyrics by Robert Burns

Methods and theory writings 

 Charles Burney – Memoirs of the Life and Writings of the Abate Metastasio
 Wenzel Hause – Méthode de contrebasse
 António da Silva Leite – Estudo de guitarra
 Bernard Viguerie – L'art de toucher le piano-forte

Births 

January 23 – Jean Reboul, librettist and poet (died 1864)
February 17 – Giovanni Pacini, composer (died 1867)
June 14 – Mathilda d'Orozco, composer (died 1863)
June 25 – Ferdinando Giorgetti, Italian composer (died 1867)
July 22 – Carlo Pepoli, librettist and politician (died 1881)
July 23 – Franz Berwald, composer (died 1868)
July 24 – Jan Czeczot, librettist and poet (died 1847)
July 28 – Ignaz Bösendorfer, piano manufacturer (died 1859)
July 29 – Christian Winther, lyricist and poet (died 1876)
August 25 – James Lick, piano builder (died 1876)
August 27 – Elise Barensfeld, soprano (died after 1820)
September 3 – Henriette Widerberg, soprano (died 1872)
September 20 – Franz Wilhelm Ferling, composer and oboist (died 1874)
November 30 – Carl Loewe, German composer (died 1869)
December 9 – Emilie Zumsteeg, composer and musician (died 1857)  
date unknown – Mirzə Şəfi Vazeh, lyricist and poet (died 1852)

Deaths 
January 1 – Alexandre-Théophile Vandermonde, chemist and musician, 60
February 16 (or April 16) – Caterina Gabrielli, operatic soprano, 65
February 17 – James Macpherson, librettist and writer (born 1736)
February 28 – Friedrich Wilhelm Rust, composer and violinist (born 1739)
March 19 – Stephen Storace, composer, 33
June 8 – Felice Giardini, violinist and composer, 80
July 17 – Thomas Sanders Dupuis, English composer (born 1733)
July 21 – Robert Burns, librettist and poet (born 1759)
August 12 – Mary Ann Wrighten Pownall, librettist and singer (born 1751)
October 17 – Franz Paul Rigler, composer and piano virtuoso (born c.1748)

October 31 – Thomas Haxby, musical instrument maker, 67 
date unknown 
Luffman Atterbury, carpenter, builder and musician
Samuel Green, organ builder (born 1740)
Nicola Sabatino, composer (born 1705)

 
18th century in music
Music by year